Quintinia is a genus of about 25 evergreen trees and shrubs native to the Philippines, New Guinea, New Zealand, New Caledonia, Vanuatu and Australia. Plants have alternate leaves. White or lilac flowers form at the end of stalks or on leaf axils. The fruiting body is a capsule, usually containing a large number of tiny seeds. The genus is named after the gardener Jean-Baptiste de la Quintinie.

Species
 Quintinia altigena
 Quintinia apoensis
 Quintinia brassii
 Quintinia epiphytica
 Quintinia fawkneri
 Quintinia hyehenensis (New Caledonia)
 Quintinia kuborensis
 Quintinia lanceolata
 Quintinia ledermannii
 Quintinia macgregorii
 Quintinia major (New Caledonia)
 Quintinia media (New Caledonia, Vanuatu)
 Quintinia minor (New Caledonia)
 Quintinia montiswilhelmii
 Quintinia nutantifora
 Quintinia oreophila (New Caledonia)
 Quintinia pachyphylla
 Quintinia quatrefagesii
 Quintinia rigida
 Quintinia schlechterana
 Quintinia serrata (New Zealand)
 Quintinia sessiliflora (New Caledonia)
 Quintinia sieberi
 Quintinia verdonii

References

External links
 

Asterid genera
Paracryphiales